Tadeusz Kościński (born 9 December 1956) is a Polish politician. He served as Minister of Finance in the second cabinet of Mateusz Morawiecki from November 2019, but resigned in February 2022 after a failed tax reform.

Beginning in 1997, Kościński was a director of Bank Zachodni WBK SA. He previously work for several Polish Banks, and has also held positions in the international finance sector in London, United Kingdom. From November 2015 to November 2019, he was Undersecretary of State at the Ministry of Dvcelopment, the Ministry of Entrepreneurship and Technology and the Ministry of Finance, consequetively. He has also been the representative of the Prime Minister at the Polish regulatory authority for the finance sector.

References 

Living people
1956 births
Politicians from London
Finance Ministers of Poland